A Suitable Boy is a BBC television drama miniseries directed by Mira Nair and adapted by Andrew Davies from Vikram Seth's 1993 novel of the same name. Set in the backdrop of post-independent India, A Suitable Boy follows four linked families in North India, where the story revolves around Mrs. Rupa Mehra who is in search of a suitable husband for her youngest daughter Lata. Meanwhile, the daughter is torn between her duty towards her mother and the idea of romance with her suitors.

The series stars Tanya Maniktala as the main character Lata, with Tabu, Ishaan Khatter, Rasika Dugal, Mahira Kakkar, Ram Kapoor, Namit Das, Vivaan Shah, Mikhail Sen, Danesh Rizvi, Shahana Goswami, Ranvir Shorey, Vijay Varma and Kulbhushan Kharbanda in prominent roles, as its storyline features more than 110 characters. It is the first BBC period-drama series to have a non-white cast.

The adaptation of the series was officially announced by Charlotte Moore, the BBC's head of content, in May 2017, with Mira Nair announced as directing the series. The principal shoot of the series took place in September 2019. The series were filmed across Lucknow, as the primary location, and also in Maheshwar and Kanpur. The background music for the series was composed by Alex Heffes and Anoushka Shankar, with Kavita Seth scoring music for the songs. It was photographed by cinematographer Declan Quinn, with Nick Fenton and Tanupriya Sharma, editing the series.

A Suitable Boy was premiered in the United Kingdom on BBC One, from 26 July to 24 August 2020. It was globally premiered on the streaming platform Netflix (excluding North America and China), with all six episodes released on 23 October 2020. In the United States and Canada, the series premiered on Acorn TV, on 7 December 2020. The series received a mixed response from critics, who praised the performances of the cast and the settings, but criticised the stereotypical portrayal of India, and the writing and direction.

Synopsis
A Suitable Boy is set in 1951, a newly post-independence, post-partition India. The novel follows four families during 18 months, and centres on Mrs. Rupa Mehra (Mahira Kakkar) and her efforts over the arrangement of the marriage of her younger daughter, Lata Mehra (Tanya Maniktala), to a "suitable boy". Lata is a 19-year-old university student who refuses to be influenced by her domineering mother or opinionated brother, Arun Mehra (Vivek Gomber). Her story revolves around the choice she is forced to make between her suitors.

Cast

Main

Recurring

Episodes

Production

Origin

In May 2017, Charlotte Moore, head of content for BBC Studios, announced for an adaptation of Vikram Seth's 1993 novel A Suitable Boy, into a mini-television series. The news was disclosed by publisher Aleph Book Company in an official press release on 5 May 2017. The makers reportedly finalized screenwriter Andrew Davies, to pen the adapted screenplay, and also decided cast non-white characters for the series, thus becoming BBC's first period drama with a non-white cast. Piers Wenger, BBC's head of drama also said to the same publication, “It’s a 20th century classic and it is obviously set outside the UK in a world which is non-white, non-British, and yet which has big universal themes at the heart of it.”

Andrew Davies eventually spoke about the main character Lata, in an interview to Deadline Hollywood stating that "Lata’s trials of the heart speak as loudly to me now as when I first read Vikram’s epic novel two decades ago. She is a great literary heroine in the tradition of Jane Austen and George Eliot. But behind her stands a massive supporting cast of striking, funny, irrepressible characters and a vision of India in the 1950s that no reader can ever forget."

In May 2019, the six-part series was officially commissioned by BBC Studios, with Indian filmmaker Mira Nair being brought on board as director. On her inclusion in the project, she stated that "I eventually liked the book, when it was published in late 1993, and tried to get the rights to adapt it into a film. But it was too big and too hard to adapt at that point. So, I created my own microcosmic response to the huge epic by making my own intimate Monsoon Wedding (2001). It is great to be going back to it." Produced on a budget of £16 million, it is one of the most expensive BBC series ever made.

Casting

Wenger, told The Telegraph UK that it was "a deliberate gamble" to adapt a drama with no white characters. In May 2019, when Mira Nair was hired for the film, she stated that 80% of the casting has been finalized, with Tabu, Shefali Shah, Vivek Gomber, Rasika Dugal and Vivaan Shah being a part of the cast. However she did not finalize the casting for the main character Lata, with a leading actress was reported to play the role, although Mira did not reveal the details, which later revealed to be Tanya Maniktala. In August 2019, Ishaan Khatter was reported to play a pivotal role in the series. Later in September 2019, Namit Das joined the cast the following month. There are 110 characters in the series.

Filming
A Suitable Boy was filmed in various locations across India. Principal photography began in Lucknow in September 2019, with the actors undergone look tests and script reading sessions, before commencing the shoot. Shooting took place in King George's Medical University in Lucknow, which was shown as Brahmpur University. In December 2019, the makers wrapped up the shooting schedule in Lucknow. The shooting came to halt after Sadaf Jafar, one of the cast members in the series got arrested by the police, due to her involvement in the protests against the new citizenship law in Lucknow, with Nair demanding for her release.

The series was followed by sequences being shot in a number of other cities in India, including Maheshwar and Kanpur in Madhya Pradesh. The makers filmed aerial shots of the Narmada river, which is shadowed by the temple complex Ahilya Fort, in the central Indian town of Maheshwar. RadioTimes cited that the river and fort provide the "soul of the series with Lata’s early morning boat rides providing some of the most memorable imagery from both the book and series".

Soundtrack 

The original soundtrack for A Suitable Boy, was scored by British composer Alex Heffes and Anoushka Shankar. Kavita Seth, who also scored the music for the series, also crooned for the voice of Saeeda Bai's character (played by Tabu). Mira approached Kavita, after following her web series Main Kavita Hoon. Before recording the song, Mira introduced Seth to the film's plot, with Seth did a lot of research for the music. She stated that "She was very clear about what she wanted for every song, about the songs' emotions, which made it easy for me to work with her". Mira approved most of her song, excluding one song. So, Kavita composed for the song within 15 minutes, which made her quite impressed. She was assigned to work on the music for 15 days, while Kavita did composing, designing and singing the songs in 3–4 days. Kavita sang most of the ghazals for Tabu's character, with retaining the songs in order to cater the international audiences as well. Namit Das composed one song for the series, marking his debut in composition. The soundtrack album featuring instrumental compositions, was released on 2 November 2020, in digital and physical formats. The 45-song soundtrack album was released in two-disc vinyl formats.

Release 
The first look stills of A Suitable Boy was released on 2 December 2019, through the social media platforms. On 11 July 2020, the official trailer of the series was released through YouTube. The series premiered in the United Kingdom on 26 July 2020 on BBC One, with the first episode being aired on the said date, and was ended on 24 August 2020.

The global distribution rights for the series (excluding North America and China), were acquired by Netflix. On 16 July 2020, Netflix announced the release of seventeen Indian originals, along with the Hindi dubbed version. The series released on 23 October 2020. The series premiered through Acorn TV, which bought the distribution rights for the United States and Canada regions, on 7 December 2020.

Reception

Critical response 
The show received mixed reactions from critics. Robyn Bahr of The Hollywood Reporter stated "The potency of Seth's story remains intact; Davies and Nair's stylization nearly clobbers it." Judy Berman, chief editor of Time magazine, wrote: "A Suitable Boy transcends escapism, it’s because she brought the substance along with the sparkle." Jude Dry of IndieWire wrote: "A Suitable Boy lacks the comedic touch of Downton Abbey or the critical lens of The Crown, languishing somewhere in the middle and coming up short. Without a defined perspective on the class and religious conflict it uses as a narrative backdrop, A Suitable Boy feels like frothy fluff — yummy in the moment but easily forgettable and won’t fill you up."

Chitra Ramaswamy of The Guardian stated: "It is beautiful, expensive and groundbreaking in its casting, yet Andrew Davies’s adaptation of Vikram Seth’s tome still feels uncomfortably old-school". The Independent magazine, chief reporter Ed Cumming wrote "This adaptation of Vikram Seth’s epic, 1300-page novel seemed promising, but we’ll have to keep waiting for an Indian family saga of rugged verisimilitude." Writing for The Times, Carol Midgley stated "a zesty new drama with a slight hint of cheese".

Writing for Hindustan Times, Rohan Nahhar wrote: "An astonishing cast, led by Ishaan Khatter, Tabu and Tanya Maniktala, struggles to make the most of minimal screentime and a mediocre script in Mira Nair’s unsuitable adaptation of Vikram Seth’s novel." Anupama Chopra, editor-in-chief of Film Companion wrote: "Mira Nair delivers a visually sumptuous saga which, despite the sizable bumps, is ultimately satisfying." Pankhuri Shukla of The Quint, praised the cast members for the acting sequences, but opined that "the English dialogues seem to be a deterrent to the actors' performances, with the occasional Urdu/Punjabi/Hindi dialogues sprinkled here and there are the only saving grace." Mimi Anthikkad Chibber of The Hindu wrote: "There is no dearth of stereotypes in this adaptation of Vikram Seth’s 1993 novel, yet the show moves too briskly and looks too lovely to ignore".

Devansh Sharma of Firstpost wrote "Seth's book was never celebrated for its plot anyway. Its primary claim to excellence was the language. Neatly and inventively crafted, Seth's words were both transportive and evocative. The translation to visuals achieves only half the job." India Today's Nairita Mukherjee wrote: "A Suitable Boy Review: In 2020, the world is capable of accepting and appreciating non-English content, as long as it has the power of good writing. That's where Mira Nair's adaptation of Vikram Seth's A Suitable Boy stumbles." In a positive note, Saibal Chatterjee of NDTV wrote "A Suitable Boy, does not miss a beat in funnelling a massive novel into an intricately stitched, necessarily pared filmed version. This panoramic portrait of a newly-free nation and fast-changing social segments within it has an easy-flowing quality that belies the sheer magnitude of the exercise." Shubhra Gupta of The Indian Express wrote "The book has enough time and more to get into long, languid, eloquent descriptions of locations, characters, situations; in Mira Nair and Andrew Davies hands, the chop-chop eventually overcomes the choppiness, and becomes its own creature."

Controversies 
The series attracted controversy when Madhya Pradesh Home Minister Narottam Mishra objected to a scene in which the characters Lata (Tanya Maniktala) and Kabir (Danesh Razvi) are shown kissing each other within the premises of a temple. His statement came after a Bharatiya Janata Party Youth leader, Gaurav Tiwari, filed a complaint against the makers on 22 November 2020 for "allegedly hurting religious sentiments". Tiwari also appealed to people at large on Twitter to uninstall the platform Netflix (which bought its global streaming rights) from their phones, as #BoycottNetflix began to trend on Twitter. It was further criticised for portraying Love Jihad. On 25 November, an FIR was filed against two executives from Netflix India, in response to the complaint registered by Tiwari.

References

External links
 
 
 

2020 British television series debuts
2020 British television series endings
2020s British drama television series
2020s British television miniseries
BBC television dramas
English-language television shows
Hinduism in pop culture-related controversies
Television series set in the 1950s
Television series by BBC Studios